When Weather Changed History was an American documentary television series that was shown The Weather Channel from 2008 to 2009. It chronicles major events in history and the effect weather had on them.

Program History
When Weather Changed History launched on January 6, 2008 with the premiere episode focusing on the space shuttle Challenger explosion. The series premiered with record high ratings for its first season of 10 episodes. As a result, a second season consisting of 14 episodes was ordered. Season 2 premiered on October 5, 2008.

The last episode of When Weather Changed History premiered in February 2009. Currently reruns can be seen, however, the current fate of the program is unknown at this time. In December 2010, The Weather Channel aired a week's worth of Viewer's Choice episodes at 8 p.m. ET.

TWC launched a similar series, Weather That Changed the World, on June 9, 2013. The show will cover three stories that had appeared on When Weather Changed History - the Challenger tragedy, the Hindenburg, and the Titanic. In addition, the killer smog that hit Donora, Pennsylvania in 1948 - which had been covered on When Weather Changed History - was also covered, along with the 1952 smog that hit London, England.

Episode list

Season 1

Season 2

References

The Weather Channel original programming
2008 American television series debuts
2009 American television series endings
2000s American documentary television series